"Here Again" is a song performed by American contemporary worship band Elevation Worship released as the second single from their eleventh live album, Hallelujah Here Below (2018), on August 17, 2018. The song was written by Amy Corbett, Chris Brown and Steven Furtick. Chris Brown and Aaron Robertson handled the production of the single.

Background
"Here Again" was released by Elevation Worship as the second single from the album Hallelujah Here Below in anticipation of its release, which was slated for September 28, 2018. The song was recorded in March 2018 at Elevation Ballantyne in Charlotte, North Carolina.

On February 1, 2019, a Spanish rendition of the song, titled "Encuéntrame Otra Vez (Here Again)" was released by Elevation Worship. On April 12, 2019, a revamped version of "Here Again" was released on Elevation Worship's album Paradoxology (2019), a collection of revamped songs initially released on Hallelujah Here Below.

Writing and development
Chris Brown had an interview with Kevin Davis, lead contributor at NewReleaseToday about the song and the inspiration behind it. Davis asked about the personal story behind the song, to which Brown responded, saying:

Composition

Music videos
On August 17, 2018, Elevation Worship released the extended live music video of "Here Again" recorded at Elevation Church's Ballantyne campus on its YouTube channel. A "YouTube Exclusive" live performance video of "Here Again" recorded at the YouTube Space in New York was released by Elevation Worship on January 18, 2019. The lyric video of "Encuéntrame Otra Vez (Here Again)" in Spanish was published on YouTube by Elevation Worship on February 8, 2019. The music video for the Paradoxology rendition of "Here Again" shot on location at Savona Mill was availed on Elevation Worship's YouTube channel on April 15, 2019.

Tracklisting

Charts

Weekly charts

Year-end charts

Release history

References

External links
 

2018 singles
Elevation Worship songs
Songs written by Steven Furtick
2018 songs